Benjamin Ozegovic (born 9 August 1999) is a professional footballer who plays as a goalkeeper for the Austrian club WSG Tirol. Born in Bosnia and Herzegovina, Ozegovic represents Austria internationally.

Club career
Ozegovic is a product of the youth academies of Sturm Graz and Austria Wien. On 27 June 2016, he signed with Altach. Ozegovic made his professional debut with Rheindorf Altach in a 2-0 Austrian Football Bundesliga loss to Admira on 7 March 2020.

International career
Born in Bosnia an Herzegovina, Ozegovic moved to Austria at a young age. He is a youth international for Austria, having represente them from U17 to U19 levels.

References

External links
 
 ÖFB Profile
 

1999 births
Living people
People from Velika Kladuša
Austrian footballers
Austria youth international footballers
Bosnia and Herzegovina footballers
Austrian people of Bosnia and Herzegovina descent
Bosnia and Herzegovina emigrants to Austria
Association football goalkeepers
SC Rheindorf Altach players
WSG Tirol players
Austrian Regionalliga players
Austrian Football Bundesliga players